Sepehr Mohammadi Kamalabadi (born 8 August 1989) is an Iranian professional futsal player. He is a goalkeeper, and currently a member of Giti Pasand and the Iran national futsal team.

Honours

Country 
 FIFA Futsal World Cup
 Third place (1): 2016
 AFC Futsal Championship
 Champion (2): 2016 - 2018
 Runners-up (1): 2014
 Asian Indoor and Martial Arts Games
 Champion (2): 2013 - 2017
 WAFF Futsal Championship
 Champion (1): 2012
 Grand Prix
 Runner-Up (1): 2015

Club 
 AFC Futsal Club Championship
 Champion (1): 2010 (Foolad Mahan)
 Runner-Up (2): 2013 (Giti Pasand) - 2017 (Giti Pasand)
 Iranian Futsal Super League
 Champion (4): 2008–09 (Foolad Mahan) - 2009–10 (Foolad Mahan) - 2012–13 (Giti Pasand) - 2016–17 (Giti Pasand)
 Runners-up (3): 2013–14 (Giti Pasand) - 2014–15 (Giti Pasand) - 2018–19 (Giti Pasand)
 Third place (1) : 2017–18 (Giti Pasand)

Individual 
 Best Goal Keeper:
 Best Goal Keeper of the Iranian Futsal Super League (2): 2015–16 - 2016–17
 Nominated for the best goalkeeper of the world By Umbro futsal awards 2017 (futsalplanet.com).

References

External links 
 
 

1989 births
Living people
Sportspeople from Isfahan
Iranian men's futsal players
Futsal goalkeepers
Foolad Mahan FSC players
Firooz Sofeh FSC players
Giti Pasand FSC players
Iranian expatriate futsal players
Iranian expatriate sportspeople in Qatar
Iranian expatriate sportspeople in Russia